Starkeya koreensis is a Gram-negative, aerobic, rod-shaped, non-spore-forming and non-motile bacteria from the family Xanthobacteraceae which has been isolated from the stem of a rice straw in Daejon in Korea.

References

Further reading

External links
Type strain of Starkeya koreensis at BacDive -  the Bacterial Diversity Metadatabase	

Hyphomicrobiales
Bacteria described in 2006